The mathematical term perverse sheaves refers to a certain abelian category associated to a topological space X, which may be a real or complex manifold, or a more general topologically stratified space, usually singular. This concept was introduced in the thesis of Zoghman Mebkhout, gaining more popularity after the (independent) work of Joseph Bernstein, Alexander Beilinson, and Pierre Deligne (1982) as a formalisation of the Riemann-Hilbert correspondence, which related the topology of singular spaces (intersection homology of Mark Goresky and Robert MacPherson) and the algebraic theory of differential equations (microlocal calculus and holonomic D-modules of Joseph Bernstein, Masaki Kashiwara and Takahiro Kawai). It was clear from the outset that perverse sheaves are fundamental mathematical objects at the crossroads of algebraic geometry, topology, analysis and differential equations. They also play an important role in number theory, algebra, and representation theory. The properties characterizing perverse sheaves already appeared in the 75's paper of Kashiwara on the constructibility of solutions of holonomic  D-modules.

Preliminary remarks 

The name perverse sheaf comes through rough translation of the French "faisceaux pervers". The justification is that perverse sheaves are complexes of sheaves which have several features in common with sheaves: they form an abelian category, they have cohomology, and to construct one, it suffices to construct it locally everywhere.

The Beilinson–Bernstein–Deligne definition of a perverse sheaf proceeds through the machinery of triangulated categories in homological algebra and has a very strong algebraic flavour, although the main examples arising from Goresky–MacPherson theory are topological in nature because the simple objects in the category of perverse sheaves are the intersection cohomology complexes. This motivated MacPherson to recast the whole theory in geometric terms on a basis of Morse theory. For many applications in representation theory, perverse sheaves can be treated as a 'black box', a category with certain formal properties.

Definition and examples
A perverse sheaf is an object C of the bounded derived category of sheaves with constructible cohomology on a space X such that the set of points x with
 or 
has real dimension at most 2i, for all i. Here jx is the inclusion map of the point x.

If X is smooth and everywhere of dimension d, then

is a perverse sheaf for any local system .

A simple example 
Let X be a  disk around the origin in  stratified so that the origin is the unique singular stratum. More generally, quivers can be used to describe perverse sheaves.

Properties
The category of perverse sheaves is an abelian subcategory of the (non-abelian) derived category of sheaves, equal to the core of a suitable t-structure,  and is preserved by Verdier duality.

The bounded derived category of perverse l-adic sheaves on a scheme X is equivalent to the derived category of constructible sheaves and similarly for sheaves on the complex analytic space associated to a scheme X/C.

Applications
Perverse sheaves are a fundamental tool for the geometry of singular spaces. Therefore, they are applied in a variety of mathematical areas. In the Riemann-Hilbert correspondence, perverse sheaves correspond to regular holonomic D-modules. This application establishes the notion of perverse sheaf as occurring 'in nature'. The decomposition theorem, a far-reaching extension of the hard Lefschetz theorem decomposition, requires the usage of perverse sheaves. Hodge modules are, roughly speaking, a Hodge-theoretic refinement of perverse sheaves. The geometric Satake equivalence identifies equivariant perverse sheaves on the affine Grassmannian  with representations of the Langlands dual group of a reductive group G - see .

String theory 
Massless fields in superstring compactifications have been identified with cohomology classes on the target space (i.e. four-dimensional Minkowski space with a six-dimensional Calabi-Yau (CY) manifold). The determination of the matter and interaction content requires a detailed analysis of the (co)homology of these spaces: nearly all massless fields in the effective physics model are represented by certain (co)homology elements. However, a troubling consequence occurs when the target space is singular. A singular target space means that only the CY manifold is singular as Minkowski space is smooth. Such a singular CY manifold is called a conifold as it is a CY manifold that admits conical singularities. Andrew Strominger observed (A. Strominger, 1995) that conifolds correspond to massless blackholes. Conifolds are important objects in string theory: Brian Greene explains the physics of conifolds in Chapter 13 of his book The Elegant Universe —including the fact that the space can tear near the cone, and its topology can change. These singular target spaces, i.e. conifolds, correspond to certain mild degenerations of algebraic varieties which appear in a large class of supersymmetric theories, including superstring theory (E. Witten, 1982). Essentially, different cohomology theories on singular target spaces yield different results thereby making it difficult to determine which theory physics may favor. Several important characteristics of the cohomology, which correspond to the massless fields, are based on general properties of field theories, specifically, the (2,2)-supersymmetric 2-dimensional world-sheet field theories. These properties, known as the Kähler package (T. Hubsch, 1992), should hold for singular and smooth target spaces. Paul Green and Tristan Hubsch (P. Green & T. Hubsch, 1988) determined that the manner in which you move between singular CY target spaces require moving through either a small resolution or deformation of the singularity (T. Hubsch, 1992) and called it the 'conifold transition'.

Tristan Hubsch (T. Hubsch, 1997) conjectured what this cohomology theory should be for singular target spaces. Tristan Hubsch and Abdul Rahman (T. Hubsch and A. Rahman, 2005) worked to solve the Hubsch conjecture by analyzing the non-transversal case of Witten's gauged linear sigma model (E. Witten, 1993) which induces a stratification of these algebraic varieties (termed the ground state variety) in the case of isolated conical singularities. Under certain conditions it was determined that this ground state variety was a conifold (P. Green & T.Hubsch, 1988; T. Hubsch, 1992) with isolated conic singularities over a certain base with a 1-dimensional exocurve (termed exo-strata) attached at each singular point. T. Hubsch and A. Rahman determined the (co)-homology of this ground state variety in all dimensions, found it compatible with Mirror symmetry and String Theory but found an obstruction in the middle dimension (T. Hubsch and A. Rahman, 2005). This obstruction required revisiting Hubsch's conjecture of a Stringy Singular Cohomology (T. Hubsch, 1997). In the winter of 2002, T. Hubsch and A. Rahman met with R.M. Goresky to discuss this obstruction and in discussions between R.M. Goresky and R. MacPherson, R. MacPherson made the observation that there was such a perverse sheaf that could have the cohomology that satisfied Hubsch's conjecture and resolved the obstruction. R.M. Goresky and T. Hubsch advised A. Rahman's Ph.D. dissertation on the construction of a self-dual perverse sheaf  (A. Rahman, 2009) using the zig-zag construction of MacPherson-Vilonen (R. MacPherson & K. Vilonen, 1986). This perverse sheaf proved the Hübsch conjecture for isolated conic singularities, satisfied Poincarè duality, and aligned with some of the properties of the Kähler package. Satisfaction of all of the Kähler package by this Perverse sheaf for higher codimension strata is still an open problem. Markus Banagl (M. Banagl, 2010; M. Banagl, et al., 2014) addressed the Hubsch conjecture through intersection spaces for higher codimension strata inspired by Hubsch's work (T. Hubsch, 1992, 1997; P. Green and T. Hubsch, 1988) and A. Rahman's original ansatz (A. Rahman, 2009) for isolated singularities.

See also
 Mixed Hodge module
 Mixed perverse sheaf
 Intersection homology
 L² cohomology
Conifold
String Theory
Supersymmetry

Notes

References

Further reading 
Intersection homology and perverse sheaves, notes by Bruno Klingler.

Homological algebra
Morse theory